Elections to Somerset County Council were held on Thursday, 5 May 1977, when the whole council of 56 members was up for election.

The result was that the Conservatives retained their control, winning 44 seats, a gain of eight. Independents ended with nine county councillors, a loss of two, and Labour with three, a loss of four, but the Liberals lost both their seats and ended with none.

Election result

|}

References

1977
1977 English local elections
20th century in Somerset